Bjørn Nilsen (15 June 1937 – 6 February 1966) was a Norwegian sprinter. He competed in the men's 100 metres at the 1956 Summer Olympics.

References

External links
 

1937 births
1966 deaths
Athletes (track and field) at the 1956 Summer Olympics
Norwegian male sprinters
Olympic athletes of Norway
Sportspeople from Stavanger